This is a list of bodhrán players, people known for playing the bodhrán.

 Alexander James Adams
 Maggie Boyle
 Ronnie Browne of The Corries
 Cormac Byrne, Uiscedwr, Seth Lakeman and others
 Bobby Clancy of The Clancy Brothers
 Kevin Conneff of The Chieftains
 Caroline Corr of The Corrs
 Aimee Farrell Courtney, winner of the 2010 World Bodhrán Championship, first woman to win this title
 Kevin Crawford of Lúnasa
 Junior Davey, 5 times All-Ireland winner 1990/1993/1996/1997/1999
 Tate Donovan  American actor and director playing with the traditional Irish band, The Descendant
 Chrigel Glanzmann of Eluveitie
 Tommy Hayes of Stockton's Wing
 John Joe Kelly of Flook
 Seamus Kennedy
 Dave King of Flogging Molly
 Dónal Lunny
 Tommy Makem
 Paddy Moloney
 Séan McCann of Canadian Folk/Roots band Great Big Sea - 1993 to present
 Johnny ("Ringo") McDonagh of De Dannan
 Peadar Mercier (1914-1991), formerly of The Chieftains and other bands
 Ruth Moody of The Wailin' Jennys
 Christy Moore
 Colm Murphy of De Dannan; tutor in bodhrán at University College, Cork, Ireland
 Fergus O'Byrne
 Mike Oldfield
 Liam Ó Maonlaí
 Seán Ó Riada
 Rónán Ó Snodaigh of Kíla
 Paul Phillips (1959–2007), player and teacher, All-Ireland winner 2003
 Debi Smith
 Leah Song of Rising Appalachia
 Chris Weddle
 Bill Whelan
 Roy Williamson

See also
 List of All-Ireland Fleadh champions

References

 
Lists of musicians by instrument